Edward August Rath III is an American politician who served as a member of the New York State Senate from the 61st district. Elected in November 2020, he assumed office on January 6, 2021.

Early life and education 
Rath was born in Amherst, New York. His mother, Mary Lou Rath, served as a member of the New York State Senate from 1993 to 2008. His grandfather, Edward A. Rath, was the first county executive of Erie County. Rath's father, Edward Rath Jr., was a justice of the New York Supreme Court. After graduating from the Nichols School, Rath earned a Bachelor of Arts degree in political science and history from Syracuse University and a Master of Business Administration from Canisius College.

Career 
From 2001 to 2003, Rath worked as a consultant for ProLiance Energy. He was later a consultant at the NOCO Energy Corporation and a sales manager for Gateway Energy. From 2012 to 2014, Rath was a manager at APG&E.

In 2008, he was elected to the Erie County Legislature, representing the sixth district. During his tenure in the legislature, he served as a member of the Public Safety Committee and drafted legislation to create a Property Tax Stabilization Fund. Rath was elected to the New York State Senate in November 2020 and assumed office on January 6, 2021.

References 

Year of birth missing (living people)
Living people
People from Amherst, New York
Syracuse University alumni
Canisius College alumni
County legislators in New York (state)
Republican Party New York (state) state senators
21st-century American politicians